Pandava Vanavasam is a 1965 Indian Telugu-language Hindu mythological film directed by Kamalakara Kameswara Rao and written by Samudrala Sr. It stars N. T. Rama Rao and Savitri, with music composed by Ghantasala. It was  produced by A. S. R. Anjaneyulu under the Madhavi Productions banner. The film was a major box office success, running for 175 days in theatres.

Plot
The film begins with the Pandavas successfully performing Rajasuya Yagam and thanking Lord Krishna for his support. Besides, Duryodhana is humiliated and raging with anger at the insults heaped on him in the Mayasabha. Sakuni consoles him and layouts a stratagem for avenge by inviting Dharma Raja for a dice game. Thereupon, Dharmaraja loses everything in it, including himself, his brothers, and Draupadi, who are subjected to great humiliation by Dussasana on the orders of Duryodhana. The Pandavas are forced into exile after Dharmaraja loses again in the dice game. During their Aranyavaasam, Bheema encounters Anjaneya and brings the flower Sowgandhika Pushpam to fulfill Draupadi's wish. Afterward, to create hurdles for the Yaga being performed by the Pandavas, Duryodhana resorts to Ghosha Yatra staying nearby and mocks them. However, when he faces defeat from Gandharva king Chitrasena, Dharmaraja sends Bheema and Arjuna for his rescue. Right now, Duryodhana once again fires with insult and decides to commit suicide but Karna and Shakuni comfort him. At that moment, they perceive the divine power behind Pandavas as Lord Krishna.

Just after, one day, when Draupadi is alone Saindhava the husband of Dushala, Kauravas' sister spots her. Febrile for her beauty and proposes which she refuses. Infuriated, Saindhava abducts Draupadi and moves toward his kingdom. Being cognizant of it, Bheema protects Draupadi and when he is about to slay him Dharma Raja commands him to live him on for piety. So, Bheema expels Saindhava by scraping his hair off his head. Parallelly, Kauravas' ploy to separate Krishna from Pandavas, so, they conspire to knit Duryodhana's son Lakshmana Kumara with Balarama's daughter Sasirekha. Indeed, her alliance is already fixed with Abhimanyu. During that plight, Bheema kindles Ghatothkacha one that boomerangs the wedding by purporting as Sasirekha and teases the men of the bridegroom with his gimmicks under the guidance of Krishna. At last, Sasirekha and Abhimanyu are coupled up. Finally, the movie ends on a happy note with the successful completion of the Pandavas' twelve-year exile period.

Cast

Soundtrack

Music composed by Ghantasala. The music was released by SAREGAMA Audio Company.

Trivia
 The film celebrated a Silver Jubilee and ran for 175 days.
 Pandava Vanavasam was also produced in Tamil.
 Kovelamudi Raghavendra Rao, who later directed over 100 movies, started his career as an assistant director for this movie.

References

External links
 

Hindu mythological films
1965 films
Films directed by Kamalakara Kameswara Rao
Films scored by Ghantasala (musician)
1960s Telugu-language films
Films based on the Mahabharata